11 Arietis (abbreviated 11 Ari) is a star in the northern constellation of Aries. 11 Arietis is the Flamsteed designation. It has an apparent visual magnitude of 6.01, which makes it a challenging target to view with the naked eye in suitably dark skies.

11 Arietis has a stellar classification of B9 IV-Vn, which may indicate that it is beginning to evolve away from the main sequence into a subgiant as the supply of hydrogen at its core becomes exhausted. At present it has an estimated 2.8 times the radius of the Sun, but this will increase as it continues to evolve into a giant star. 11 Arietis is spinning rapidly with a projected rotational velocity of 249 km/s. This motion, combined with the Doppler effect, is causing the absorption lines in the spectrum to spread out and become 'nebulous', as indicated by the 'n' suffix in the classification.

References

External links
 HR 615
 CCDM J02068+2542
 Image 11 Arietis

B-type main-sequence stars
012885
Arietis, 11
009859
Aries (constellation)
0615
Durchmusterung objects